Fine-Lubinsky syndrome is a rare genetic disorder which is characterized by ocular and hearing problems, speech and developmental delay, short stature, intellectual disabilities and facial dysmorphisms.


Presentation 

Symptoms may vary from person to person, but they generally are (but are not limited to):
 Intellectual disabilities of varying degree
 Congenital hearing loss
 Congenital cataracts and/or glaucoma
 Brachycephaly
 Brain abnormalities (often leading to behavioral problems)
 Finger abnormalities
 Cleft palate
 Flat face
 Ptosis
 Long philtrum
 Small mouth
 Short nose
 Microstomia
 Scrotum hypoplasia

Etiology 

Although most cases of Fine-Lubinsky syndrome are sporadic, a case report of two siblings with this syndrome was published, suggesting that it's caused by autosomal recessive mutations in the MAF gene

References 

Rare genetic syndromes
Syndromes with intellectual disability
Syndromes with short stature
Hearing loss with craniofacial syndromes
Autosomal recessive disorders